The 2020 Women's EuroHockey Indoor Nations Championship is the 20th edition of the tournament. It takes place from 24 to 26 January 2020 in Minsk, Belarus.

Qualified Teams
The following teams, shown with pre-tournament world rankings, participated in the 2020 EuroHockey Indoor Championship.

Format
The eight teams are split into two groups of four teams. The top two teams advance to the semifinals to determine the winner in a knockout system. The bottom two teams play in a new group with the teams they did not play against in the group stage. The last two teams will be relegated to the EuroHockey Indoor Nations Championship II.

Results
''All times are local (UTC+3).

Preliminary round

Pool A

Pool B
</onlyinclude>

Fifth to eighth place classification

Pool C
The points obtained in the preliminary round against the other team are taken over.

First to fourth place classification

Semi-finals

Third place game

Final

Statistics

Final standings

Awards

Goalscorers

External link
Tournament at eurohockey.com

References

Women's EuroHockey Indoor Championship
International women's field hockey competitions hosted by Belarus
EuroHockey Indoor Nations Championship
EuroHockey Indoor Nations Championship Women
Women 1
EuroHockey Indoor Nations Championship Women
Sports competitions in Minsk